The Ministry of Justice and Community Services of Vanuatu oversees or provides support to the following law-related agencies: the courts (Supreme, Magistrates, Island Courts), the tribunals, the correctional centres, child rights, family protection, disability advocacy and services, empowerment of women, and public prosecution and defense services as well as legal advice to the government. The ministry also supports agencies that review and create new laws and safeguard human rights.

List of ministers (Post-1980 upon achieving independence) 

 Walter Lini (1979-1988)
 Donald Kalpokas (1989-1990) [referred to as the Minister of Foreign Affairs and Justice]
 Sethy Regenvanu (1992-1996) 
 Joe Natuman (1996) [referred to as the Minister for Judicial Services, Culture and Women's Affairs]
 Hilda Lini (1996-1997) [referred to as the Minister of Justice, Culture and Women's Affairs] [1st female]
 Walter Lini (1998) [referred to as the Minister of Justice, Culture and Women's Affairs and Minister of Justice and Internal Affairs]
 Vincent Boulekone (1999) [referred to as the Minister of Internal Affairs]
 Barnabas Tabi (2000-2002) [referred to as the Minister of Internal Affairs]
 Joe Natuman (2003) [referred to as the Minister of Internal Affairs]
 George Wells (2004-2007) [referred to as the Minister of Internal Affairs]
 Pakoa Kaltonga (2008-2010) [referred to as the Minister of Justice and Women's Affairs]
 Yoan Simon (2011) [referred to as the Minister of Justice and Social Affairs]
 Ralph Regenvanu (2011-2012) [referred to as the Minister of Justice and Social Affairs]
 Thomas Laken (2012-2013) [referred to as the Minister of Justice and Social Welfare]
 Maki Simelum (2013) [referred to as the Minister of Justice and Social Welfare]
 Silas Yatan (2013)
 Alfred Carlot (2014-2015)
 Torba MP Dunstan Hilton (2015-2016)
 Ronald Warsal (2016-present) [referred to as the Minister of Justice and Community Services]

See also 

 Justice ministry
 Politics of Vanuatu

References 

Justice ministries
Government of Vanuatu